Never My Soul! is a 2001 Turkish film by Kutluğ Ataman. The film, with a duration of about two hours, is about Ceyhan Firat, a Turkish trans woman residing in Switzerland who makes her living as a sex worker. Firat pretends to be Turkish actress Türkan Şoray. The film's title refers to a common saying in Turkish film: a girl who is being targeted by a rapist may tell him that he could have her body but never her soul.

Notes

Further reading
Çakirlar, Cüneyt. "Queer Art of Parallaxed Document: Visual Discourse of Docudrag in Kutluğ Ataman's Never My Soul! (2001)" (Chapter 15). In: Pullen, Christopher. LGBT Transnational Identity and the Media. Palgrave Macmillan. 29 February 2012. , 9780230353510.

External links
 "Kutluğ Ataman Never My Soul, 2001  - TBA21

2001 films
Turkish LGBT-related films
LGBT-related drama films
2001 LGBT-related films
Transgender-related films
2001 drama films
Turkish drama films